The CWA Tag Team Championship is the primary wrestling tag team title in the Century Wrestling Alliance. Double Trouble (Tony and Val Puccio) were the first team to win the titles by defeating The Interns in Wakefield, Massachusetts on September 23, 1993. The title was renamed as the NWA New England Tag Team Championship when the CWA joined the National Wrestling Alliance and became NWA New England in January 1998. The tag team title returned to its original name when the CWA withdrew from the NWA on March 10, 2007.

Title history
Silver areas in the history indicate periods of unknown lineage.

References

National Wrestling Alliance championships
Tag team wrestling championships
Regional professional wrestling championships